The Nicholson Cutoff (also known as Clark's Summit-Hallstead Cutoff) is a railroad segment of the Sunbury Line rail line and formerly a railroad segment of the Delaware, Lackawanna and Western Railroad main line and the Delaware and Hudson Railway South Line. The Nicholson Cutoff and the rest of the Sunbury Line is owned by Norfolk Southern Railway.

History
The Nicholson Cutoff was built by the Delaware, Lackawanna and Western Railroad to replace the original Lackawanna line between Clarks Summit, Pennsylvania, and Hallstead, Pennsylvania. In surveying potential routes for the new line, the Lackawanna investigated the possibility of building a line directly from Clarks Summit to Nichols, New York, bypassing Binghamton, New York. As about half of the old line was curved track, a major rationale for building the new line would be to "straighten-out" the route. The new route, the cutoff, would ultimately eliminate two-thirds of this curvature, 2400 degrees, the equivalent of more than six and a half circles. Nearly all the remaining curves would be 2° ( radius) or less, permitting  or greater for passenger trains. This was a decided improvement over the curves on the old route, some of which exceeded 6° ( radius, restricting trains to ).

Construction on the Nicholson Cutoff started in May 1912 and the first revenue train to run over the line was on November 6, 1915.  While the new  line resulted in only a modest savings in travel distance the cutoff saved a significant amount of travel time between Scranton, Pennsylvania, and Binghamton, New York, especially for freight trains.  Before the building of the cutoff, heavy westbound coal trains, bringing anthracite coal from Scranton, required pushers to be added in three different locations—LaPlume, Nicholson, and Hallstead—once they got past the top of the grade at Clarks Summit.  The new line eliminated the need for these additional engines and crews, not to mention that these trains no longer needed to stop for the pushers to be added.

The Cutoff was built in a manner similar to that of the Lackawanna Cut-Off in New Jersey that had opened in December 1911. This is not surprising as the chief civil engineer on both projects was George J. Ray. But unlike the New Jersey Cut-Off, which used reinforced concrete in all its structures, the Pennsylvania Cutoff used other materials (such as bricks) as well. Indeed, the brick-lined Nicholson Tunnel ( long, located at Milepost 160) is the only tunnel on the cutoff, and the only brick-lined tunnel ever constructed by the Lackawanna. Nevertheless, the most significant structures on the line, the viaducts at Nicholson, Pennsylvania and Martins Creek, Pennsylvania, were built of reinforced concrete. The Tunkhannock Viaduct at Nicholson, the line's namesake, is considered to be the world's largest concrete structure. Over the years, Nicholson Viaduct would become a symbol of the engineering accomplishments of the Lackawanna.

The Nicholson Cutoff was used for freight and passenger trains of the Delaware, Lackawanna and Western Railroad and later used for trains of the Erie Lackawanna Railway, Conrail, Delaware and Hudson Railway, Guilford Rail System (now CSX Corporation), New York, Susquehanna and Western Railway, Canadian Pacific Railway and Norfolk Southern Railway. Noteworthy passenger trains included the Lackawanna's (and later, the Erie Lackawanna's as well) Phoebe Snow, Owl and New York Mail. However, the named trains did not stop at the towns en route, except, in some instances, Hallstead and New Milford.

The Nicholson Cutoff was opened as a rail line, however it became a railroad segment when it became part of the Delaware, Lackawanna and Western main line. Currently as a railroad segment, the Nicholson Cutoff served as part of the Delaware, Lackawanna and Western main line, the Delaware and Hudson South Line and now the Sunbury Line. In 2015, the Nicholson Cutoff and the rest of the Sunbury Line became a Norfolk Southern property.

Notes

References 
 

Delaware, Lackawanna and Western Railroad
Erie Lackawanna Railway
Delaware and Hudson Railway
Canadian Pacific Railway
Norfolk Southern Railway
Railroad cutoffs
Delaware, Lackawanna and Western Railroad lines